Stavernsodden Lighthouse is a coastal lighthouse in the municipality of Larvik in Vestfold og Telemark, Norway. It was first lit in 1855, and was automated in 1984. The lighthouse was listed as a protected site in 1997.

See also
Lighthouses in Norway
List of lighthouses in Norway

References

External links

 Norsk Fyrhistorisk Forening (in Norwegian)

Lighthouses completed in 1855
Lighthouses in Vestfold og Telemark
Listed lighthouses in Norway